Mario Righetti (born c. 1590) was an Italian painter of the Baroque period.

He was born at Bologna. He became a pupil of Lucio Massari. In Bologna, he painted an Archangel Michael for the church of San Guglielmo; a Christ appearing to the Magdalen for San Giacomo Maggiore; an Adoration of the Magi for the church of Sant'Agnese; and a Nativity that once adorned the church of Santa Lucia (now deconsecrated).

References

1590s births
16th-century Italian painters
Italian male painters
17th-century Italian painters
Painters from Bologna
Italian Baroque painters
Year of death unknown